Midwest Cascade is a neighborhood of Atlanta at the city's far west edge.  Together with the tiny neighborhood of Regency Trace it forms NPU Q, the city's fastest growing NPU from 2000 to 2010.

Location
The neighborhood is  large and bounded by unincorporated Fulton County on all sides, except for the city of Atlanta's NPU P and its Niskey Lake neighborhood on the south. The unincorporated area to the west is organized as the Sandtown community. 

Midwest Cascade is located south of Cascade Road, along Regency Center Drive.

Annexation 
The Atlanta City Council voted to annex Midwest Cascade to the City of Atlanta on September 29, 2006.

Demographics
The NPU went from 1,024 residents in 2000 to  1,770 in 2010, an increase of 72.9%.

The NPU is 96.5% black (2010 census), the highest proportion of any NPU in the city. Small minorities include whites (1.4%) and Hispanics (1.4%).

External links
 City of Atlanta Annexation Service Plan, Midwest Cascade Area

References

Neighborhoods in Atlanta